Geumcheon-myeon is a myeon, or township, in eastern Cheongdo County, North Gyeongsang Province, South Korea. Geumcheon-myeon is composed of 10 subdivisions known as ri.

The Dongchang River runs through Geumcheon-myeon. Geumcheon is also the home of the Ungang Old House and Geumcheon Middle and High School, the only High School in eastern Cheongdo. It is also home to several buddhist temples and Confucian academies.

Donggok-ri marks the eastern frontier of cow country in Cheongdo. Geumcheon is also well known for persimmons.

Towns and townships in North Gyeongsang Province
Cheongdo County